Alabama Jubilee may refer to:

 Alabama Jubilee Hot Air Balloon Classic
 Mobile Bay jubilee, a periodic natural summer phenomenon wherein sea life comes near shore
 "Alabama Jubilee" (song), by Jack Yellen